A burqa or a burka  is an enveloping outer garment worn by some Muslim women which fully covers the body and the face. Also known as a chadaree   or chaadar (Urdu, Dari: چادر) in Pakistan and Afghanistan, or a paranja  in Central Asia, the Arab version of the burqa is called the boshiya and is usually black. The term burqa is sometimes conflated with the niqāb even though, in more precise usage, the niqab is a face veil that leaves the eyes uncovered, while a burqa covers the entire body from the top of the head to the ground, with a mesh screen which only allows the wearer to see in front of her. The burqa should also not be confused with the hijab, a garment which covers the hair, neck and all or part of the chest, but does not cover the face.

The wearing of the burqa and other types of face veils have been attested to since pre-Islamic times. Face veiling has not been regarded as a religious requirement by most Islamic scholars, either in the past or the present. A minority of scholars in the Islamic jurisprudence (fiqh) consider it to be obligatory for Muslim women when they are in the presence of non-related (i.e., non-) males in order to prevent men from looking at (perversely)women while not obliging men to wear eye-covering but to lower their gaze. Women may wear the burqa for a number of reasons, including compulsion, as was the case during the Taliban's first rule of Afghanistan.

The following Muslim-majority nations and non-Muslim nations have fully or partially banned burqas: Austria, France, Belgium, Denmark, Bulgaria, the Netherlands (in public schools, hospitals and on public transport), Germany (partial bans in some states), Italy (in some localities), Spain (in some localities of Catalonia), Russia (in the Stavropol Krai), Luxembourg, Switzerland, Norway (in nurseries, public schools and universities), Canada (in the public workplace in Quebec), Gabon, Chad, Senegal, the Republic of the Congo, Cameroon (in some localities), Niger (in some localities), Sri Lanka, Tajikistan, Azerbaijan (in public schools), Turkey (in the judiciary, military and police), Kosovo (in public schools), Bosnia and Herzegovina (in courts and other legal institutions), Morocco (ban on manufacturing, marketing and sale), Tunisia (in public institutions), Egypt (in universities), Algeria (in the public workplace), and China (in Xinjiang).

Pre-Islamic use of the face veil

The face veil was originally part of women's dress among certain classes in the Byzantine Empire and was adopted into Muslim culture during the Arab conquest of the Middle East.

However, although Byzantine art before Islam commonly depicts women with veiled heads or covered hair, it does not depict women with veiled faces. In addition, the Greek geographer Strabo, writing in the 1st century AD, refers to some Median women veiling their faces; and the early third-century Christian writer Tertullian clearly refers in his treatise The Veiling of Virgins to some "pagan" women of "Arabia" wearing a veil that covers not only their head but also the entire face. Clement of Alexandria commends the contemporary use of face coverings. There are also two Biblical references to the employment of covering face veils in Genesis 38:14 and Genesis 24:65, by Tamar and by Rebeccah, Judah and Abraham's daughters-in-law respectively. These primary sources show that some women in Egypt, Arabia, ancient Israel, and Persia veiled their faces long before Islam. In the case of Tamar, the Biblical text, 'When Judah saw her, he thought her to be a harlot; because she had covered her face' indicates customary, if not sacral, use of the face veil to accentuate rather than disguise sexuality.

Coptic Orthodox Christian women historically have worn dark-coloured full garments, along with a Christian head covering that included a veil to wear in public. Women who are unmarried wear white-coloured veils and married women wear black-coloured veils.

Face veiling in Islam
Despite legal requirements and prevalence in certain regions, most Islamic scholars and most contemporary Islamic jurists have agreed that Islam does not require women to cover their faces.

Scriptural sources 

Although the Quran commands both men and women to behave modestly and contains no precise prescription for how women should dress, certain Quranic verses have been used in exegetical discussions of face veiling. Coming after a verse which instructs men to lower their gaze and guard their modesty, verse 24:31 instructs women to do the same, providing additional detail:

The verse goes on to list a number of other types of exempted males. Classical Quranic commentators differed in their interpretation of the phrase "except what is apparent outwardly". Some argued that it referred to face and hands, implying that these body parts need not be covered, while others disagreed.

Another passage, known as the "mantle verse" (33:59), has been interpreted as establishing women's security as a rationale for veiling:

Based on the context of the verse and early Islamic literature, this verse has been generally understood as establishing a way to protect the Muslim women from a hostile faction who had molested them on the streets of Medina, claiming that they confused them with slave girls.

Islamic scholars who hold that face veiling is not obligatory also base this on a narration from one of the canonical hadith collections (sayings attributed to Muhammad), in which he tells Asma', the daughter of Abu Bakr: "O Asmaʿ, when a woman reaches the age of menstruation, it does not suit her that she displays her parts of body except this and this", pointing to her face and hands (Abū Dawūd, Book 32, Number 4092). According to Yusuf al-Qaradawi, traditional hadith scholars have not viewed this narration as providing proof on its own, because its recorded chain of transmission made them uncertain about its authenticity, but those who argued that face veiling is not required have used it as supporting evidence strengthened by other textual sources, such as those recording customary practice at the time of Muhammad and his companions.

Classical jurisprudence

When veiling was discussed in early Islamic jurisprudence beyond the context of prayer, it was generally considered an "issue of social status and physical safety". The majority opinion which emerged during that time, predominant among Maliki and Hanafi jurists, held that women should cover everything except their faces in public. The Hanbali jurist Ibn Taymiyyah (d. 1328 CE) was an influential proponent of the latter view, while the Hanafi scholar Burhan al-Din al-Marghinani (d. 1197 CE) stressed that it was particularly important for a woman to leave her face and hands uncovered during everyday business dealing with men. There was a difference of opinion on this question within the legal schools. Thus, Yusuf al-Qaradawi quotes classical Shafi'i and Hanbali jurists stating that covering the face is not obligatory.

Salafi views

According to the Salafi point of view, it is obligatory for a woman to cover her entire body when in public or in presence of non-mahram men. Some interpretations say that a veil is not compulsory in front of blind men.

The Salafi scholar Muhammad Nasiruddin al-Albani wrote a book expounding his view that the face veil is not a binding obligation upon Muslim women, while he was a teacher at Islamic University of Madinah. His opponents within the Saudi establishment ensured that his contract with the university was allowed to lapse without renewal.

Reasons for wearing
Reasons for wearing a burqa vary. A woman may choose to wear it to express her piety, modesty, rejection of Western culture, political views, and cultural views among other reasons. A woman may also wear a burqa on being forced to do so by law, or protection, as was in the case of Afghanistan during the first period of Taliban rule.

Around the world

Africa

Cameroon

In July 2015, Cameroon's Far North Region banned Islamic face veils, including the burqa, after two female suicide bombers dressed in Islamic garments detonated themselves in Fotokol, killing 13. The ban is now active in five of country's ten regions.

Chad

In June 2015, the full face veil was banned in Chad after veiled Boko Haram members disguised as women committed multiple suicide bombings in N'Djamena.

Republic of the Congo

In May 2015, the Republic of the Congo banned the face veil in order to counter Islamic extremism. The decision was announced by El Hadji Djibril Bopaka, the president of the country's Islamic High Council.

Gabon 

In 2015, Gabon banned the face veil in order to counter Islamic extremism in public and places of work.

Morocco 

The government distributed letters to businesses on 9 January 2017 declaring a ban on the sale, production and importation of burqas. The letters indicated that businesses were expected to clear their stock within 48 hours.

Asia

Afghanistan

The full Afghan chadaree covers the wearer's entire face except for a small region about the eyes, which is covered by a concealing net or grille. They are usually light blue in the Kabul area, white in the north in Mazar-i-Sharif and brown and green in Kandahar in the south.

Before the Taliban took power in Afghanistan, the chadaree was rarely worn in cities, especially Kabul. While they were in power, the Taliban required the wearing of a chadaree in public. Officially, it is required under the present Afghan regime, as of May 8, 2022. Chadaree use in the remainder of Afghanistan is variable and was observed to be gradually declining in Kabul, until the city fell to the Taliban on 15 August 2021. Due to political instability in these areas, women who might not otherwise be inclined to wear the chadaree must do so as a matter of personal safety, according to Khalid Hanafi. The Taliban, after taking over Afghanistan, declared that while women may return to work, they must always wear the hijab while outside the house, while burqa was not mandatory. In May, the Taliban issued a decree that all women in public should wear a burka.

China
In 2017, China banned the burqa in the Islamic area of Xinjiang.

India

Among the Muslim population in India (about 14.2% as of the 2011 census), the burqa was formerly common in many areas, such as Old Delhi, for example. In Nizamuddin Basti, the obligation of a woman to wear a burqa is dependent on her age, according to a local informant: young, unmarried women or young, married women in their first years of marriage are required to wear the burqa. However, after this the husband usually decides if his wife should continue to wear a burqa. In addition, the Indian burqa is a slim black cloak different from the style worn in Afghanistan.

Israel

A group of Haredi (ultra-Orthodox) Jewish women in Israel began to don the Burqa as a symbol of piety. Following its adoption by Bruria Keren, an Israeli religious leader who taught a strict interpretation of Jewish scripture to female adherents, an estimated 600 Jewish women started to wear the veil. Keren claimed to have adopted wearing the burqa to "save men from themselves. A man who sees a woman's body parts is sexually aroused, and this might cause him to commit sin. Even if he doesn't actually sin physically, his impure thoughts are sin in themselves." However, a rabbinical authority said "There is a real danger that by exaggerating, you are doing the opposite of what is intended [resulting in] severe transgressions in sexual matters," and issued an edict declaring burqa-wearing a sexual fetish, and as promiscuous as wearing too little.

According to The Jerusalem Post, in 2010, a Member of the Knesset intended to put forward a bill to "prohibit the wearing of a full-body and face covering for women. [The] bill would not differentiate between Muslims and Jews".

Sri Lanka 

In April 2019, face-covering clothing was banned in Sri Lanka in the aftermath of the 2019 Easter Sunday bombings by jihadists.

Syria
Syria is a Baathist state and discourages the wearing of hijab. Ghiyath Barakat, Syria's minister of higher education, announced that the government would ban students, teachers or staff from covering faces at universities, stating that the veils ran counter to "secular and academic principles of the country".

Tajikistan 

In 2017 the government of Tajikistan passed a law requiring people to "stick to traditional national clothes and culture", which has been widely seen as an attempt to prevent women from wearing Islamic clothing, in particular the style of headscarf wrapped under the chin, in contrast to the traditional Tajik headscarf tied behind the head.

Europe

Austria
In 2017, a legal ban on face-covering clothing in public spaces was adopted by the Austrian parliament including Islamic face-covering garments. The government stated that accepting and respecting Austrian values is essential to the peaceful co-existence between the Austrian majority population and immigrants. The ban came into force on 1 October 2017 and carried a fine of 150 euros.

It is reported that there are 150 Austrian women who wear the burqa.

Belgium
On 29 April 2010, the lower house of parliament in Belgium passed a bill banning any clothing that would obscure the identity of the wearer in places like parks and in the street. The proposal was passed without dissent, and was then also passed by the Senate. BBC News estimated that only "around 30 women wear this kind of veil in Belgium, out of a Muslim population of around half a million." The ban came into effect in Belgium in July 2011. On 11 July 2017, the ban was upheld by the European Court of Human Rights (ECHR) after having been challenged by two Muslim women who claimed their rights had been infringed.

Bulgaria
The Parliament of Bulgaria outlawed the wearing of any clothing "that partially or completely covers the face" in public places such as government offices, educational and cultural institutions, and places of public recreation, except for health or professional reasons from 30 September 2016. Anyone who violates the law is liable to a fine of up to 1,500 levs (US$860). The Muslim community makes up 15% of the Bulgarian population of 7.1 million.

Denmark 

In Denmark, the burqa is often described as "oppressing women", and incompatible with Danish values.

In autumn 2017, the Danish government agreed to adopt a law prohibiting people to wear "attire and clothing masking the face in such a way that it impairs recognizability". A full ban on both niqabs and burqas was announced on 31 May 2018. The ban came into force on 1 August 2018 and carries a fine of 1000 DKK, then about 134 euro; repeat offenses are punishable with fines up to 10,000 DKK. The law targets all garments that cover the face, such as fake beards or balaclavas. Supporters of the ban claim that the ban facilitates integration of Muslims into Danish society, while Amnesty International claimed the ban violated women's rights. On the date the law came into force, a protest numbering 300-400 people was held in Copenhagen's Nørrebro district organised by Socialist Youth Front,  and Party Rebels, with protesters wearing various head coverings including party masks.

France

Wearing the burqa has not been allowed in French public schools since 2004, when it was judged to be a religious symbol, similar to the Christian cross, and was outlawed for wear within schools as an application of an established 1905 law that prohibits students and staff from wearing any clearly visible religious symbols. The law relates to the time where the secular French state took over control of most schools from the Catholic Church; it does not apply to private or religious schools. This was followed on 22 June 2009, when the then-President of France, Nicolas Sarkozy, said that burqas were "not welcome" in France, commenting that "In our country, we cannot accept that women be prisoners behind a screen, cut off from all social life, deprived of all identity". The French National Assembly appointed 32 lawmakers from right- and left-wing parties to a six-month fact-finding mission to look at ways of restricting its use. On 26 January 2010, the commission reported that access to public services and public transport should be barred to those wearing the burqa. On 13 July 2010, the Assembly overwhelmingly approved a bill banning burqas and niqabs.

On 14 September 2010, the French Senate overwhelmingly approved a ban on burqas in public, with the law becoming effective beginning on 11 April 2011. When the measure was sent in May to the parliament, it was stated that "Given the damage it produces on those rules which allow the life in community, ensure the dignity of the person and equality between sexes, this practice, even if it is voluntary, cannot be tolerated in any public place".

The ban is officially called "The bill to forbid concealing one's face in public". "It refers neither to Islam nor to veils. Officials insist the law against face-covering is not discriminatory because it would apply to everyone, not just Muslims. They cite a host of exceptions, including motorcycle helmets, or masks for health reasons, fencing, skiing or carnivals".

In 2014, the European Court of Human Rights upheld the French ban on burqa, accepting the argument of the French government that the law was based on "a certain idea of living together".

In 2022, France’s top administrative court ruled against allowing body-covering “burkini” swimwear in public pools for religious reasons, arguing that it violates the principle of government neutrality toward religion.

Germany
In a 2016 speech, accepting her nomination for reelection, the German chancellor Angela Merkel called for banning the burqa in Germany "wherever legally possible", which was interpreted as support for the earlier proposal by Interior Minister Thomas de Maizière to outlaw full-face veils in public buildings. The announcement was seen as an attempt to counter public anger at Merkel's handling of the migrant crisis and electoral gains by the anti-immigration AfD party. In 2017, a legal ban on face-covering clothing for soldiers and state workers during work was approved by the German parliament. Also in 2017, a legal ban on face-covering clothing for car and truck drivers was approved by the German Ministry of Traffic. In July 2017 the state of Bavaria approved a ban on face-covering clothing for teachers, state workers and students at university and schools.

In August 2017, the state of Lower Saxony banned the burqa along with the niqab in public schools. This change in the law was prompted by a Muslim pupil in Osnabrück who wore the garment to school for years and refused to take it off. The law was instituted to prevent similar cases in the future following the completion of her schooling.

In July 2020, the state of Baden-Württemberg banned face-covering veils for pupils, an extension of the ban already in force for school staff.

Italy
In Italy, by an anti-terrorism law passed in 1975, it is forbidden to wear any dress that hides the face of a person. At that time, Italy was facing domestic (not Islam-related) terrorism. In May 2010, it was reported that a Tunisian woman was fined €500 for this offence.

Latvia
In 2016, it was wrongly claimed in foreign media that a legal ban of face-covering Islamic clothing was adopted by the Latvian parliament. After long public discussions draft legislation was approved by Latvian government on 22 August 2017; however, it was never adopted by the parliament as a law.

Malta
Malta has no restrictions on Islamic dressing such as the veil (hijab) nor the full face veil (burqa and/or niqab) but strictly speaking face covering is illegal. An official ban on face covering for religious reasons is ambiguous. It is guaranteed that individuals are allowed to wear as they wish at their private homes and at the Mosque. Imam El Sadi stated his belief that banning of the niqab and the burka "offends Muslim women". Elsadi said that the Malteses' attitude towards Muslim women is positive and, despite cultural clashes, they tolerate the dressing. Some Muslim women share the belief that it is sinful to be seen in public without veiling themselves; however, they are legally required to remove it when needed.

Netherlands
On 27 January 2012, a bill was agreed upon by the Dutch cabinet, banning any clothing that would hide the wearer's identity, with potential fines for wearing a burqa in public going up to 380 euros. However, it did not pass in Parliament. In October 2012, this law was mitigated by the succeeding cabinet to pertain only to public transport, health care, education and government buildings, rather than all public spaces.

On 22 May 2015, a bill was agreed upon by the Dutch cabinet, banning wearing a burqa in public places. Public places would have included public transportation, educational institutes, public health institutes, and government buildings. In the courtroom, a burqa or a niqab could not be worn, with both allowed in public spaces. Police officers could have requested one to remove face-covering clothing for identification purposes. There were exceptions, such as during carnival or other festivities, and when face-covering clothing was necessary as a sports or job requirement. Opposition party D66 commented on the burqa abolishment as tokenism, while PVV labelled the ban unsatisfactory. Minister of Internal Affairs, Plasterk, has stated that setting a norm is important.

The May 2015 bill did not pass either, but a new bill was proposed in November 2015, which was eventually made into law. On 26 June 2018, a partial ban on face covering (including burqas) on public transport and in buildings and associated yards of educational institutions, governmental institutions and healthcare institutions was enacted, with a number of exceptions. From 1 August 2019 a national burka ban was introduced in the Netherlands.

, 200-400 Dutch women were believed to wear a burqa or niqab.

Norway
In June 2018, the parliament of Norway passed a bill banning clothing covering the face at educational institutions as well as daycare centres, which included face-covering Islamic veils. The prohibition applies to pupils and staff alike.

Sweden 
In 2012, a poll by Uppsala University found that Swedes responded that face-covering Islamic veils are either completely unacceptable or fairly unacceptable, 85% for the burqa and 81% for the niqab. The researchers noted these figures represented a compact resistance to the face-covering veil by the population of Sweden.

In December 2019, the municipality of Skurup banned Islamic veils in educational institutions. Earlier, the municipality of Staffanstorp approved a similar ban.

Switzerland
The burqa was outlawed in the canton of Ticino after a citizen initiative to hold a referendum. With 65% in favour of a ban, it was ruled that the ban was constitutional, and took effect in July 2016. Those who violate the law face a fine of up to CHF 10,000.

In September 2018, a ban on face-covering veils was approved with a 67% vote in favour in the canton of St. Gallen. The largest Islamic community organisation in Switzerland, the Islamic Central Council, recommended that Muslim women continue to cover their faces.

During the federal votation of the 7 March 2021 regarding the prohibition of face-covering, the Swiss people voted for the prohibition. The question submitted for the referendum was initiated from a right-wing political group affiliated with the Swiss People's Party. Although very few women in Switzerland actually wear a burqa or niqab, the proposition has been made with the intention to forbid these outfits in public spaces. 51.4% of the population participated in the vote, 51.2% of them agreed with the initiative.

United Kingdom

Face veils have caused debate in the United Kingdom. Former Labour party MP for Blackburn Jack Straw attracted controversy in 2006 after asking Muslim women from his constituency to remove any veils covering their faces during face-to-face constituency surgeries. Despite explaining to the media that a female staffer would remain in the room during any potential meeting, reaction was varied, with some Muslim groups saying that they understood his concerns, and others rejecting his request as prejudicial. A poll in 2011 indicated that 66 per cent of British people supported banning the burqa in all public places. However, a ban on burqas was ruled out by the Conservative government, and in 2018 Theresa May stated "we do not support a ban on the wearing of the veil in public".

Oceania

Australia
In 2010, Australian Liberal Senator Cory Bernardi called for the burqa to be banned in Australia, branding it "un-Australian". The ban did not go ahead, but the debate about the burqa continues.

In 2011, Carnita Matthews of Sydney was sentenced to six months jail for making a statement accusing a police officer of attempting to forcibly lift her niqab, which news sources initially referred to incorrectly as a burqa. The officer had pulled her over for a random breath test and then ticketed her for a licence infringement. Matthews allegedly then submitted a signed complaint to a police station while wearing a niqab. Judge Clive Jeffreys overturned the conviction in June 2011, citing what he thought were differences between the signature on her license and that on the complaint. She then proceeded to seek legal costs. Matthews was subsequently revealed to have a considerable record of unpaid fines and licence revocations that cast doubt on her character.

On 4 July 2011, New South Wales became the first Australian state to pass laws allowing police to demand that burqas (and other headgear such as motorcycle helmets) be removed when asking for identification.

In October 2014, the Speaker of the House and President of the Senate at Parliament House in Canberra decreed that female visitors wearing a face covering would have to sit in the separated glassed-in areas of the public gallery normally reserved for schoolchildren. This was in response to a planned disruptive action by a political activist group. Prime Minister Tony Abbott stated that he opposed this restriction. The decision was subsequently reversed.

In August 2017, Senator Pauline Hanson arrived at the Senate wearing a burqa in protest, calling for the garment to be banned. Following the incident, ReachTEL polled 2,832 Australians and found that 56.3% supported banning the wearing of the burqa in public places.

Canada

Quebec
On June 16, 2019, Bill 21 was passed which banned all religious symbols in the public sector for those in a position of authority i.e teachers, police officers, judges and lawyers amongst others. It also banned the face veil (niqab, burqa) when receiving public services. It has so far been upheld by the courts due to the passing of the notwithstanding clause.

See also

 Abaya
 Anti-mask laws
 Bagism
 Burqa ban
 Burqini
 Chador
 Christian clothing
 Cowl
 Ghoonghat
 Hijab
 Islam and clothing
 Jewish religious clothing
 List of religious headgear
 List of types of sartorial hijab
 Niqāb
 Paranja
 Religious clothing
 Women and religion
 Women in Christianity
 Women in Islam
 Women in Judaism
 Yashmak

References

Notes

Citations

External links

 Burqa ban: What it means for the West – TCN News
 France's burqa ban – background by Radio France Internationale in English
 The absence of evidence for banning burqas – The Guardian
 The Islamic veil across Europe – BBC
 Beautiful Burqas  – slideshow by Life magazine
 "influence of Persian language in Arabic"

Afghan clothing
Dresses
Gowns
History of Asian clothing
Islam-related controversies
Islamic female clothing
Purdah
Veils